A noria is a machine for lifting water into a small aqueduct.

Noria may also refer to:

 Asher Noria (born 1992), Indian sport shooter
 Noria Mabasa (born 1938), South African artist
 Noria Manouchi (born 1991), Swedish politician

See also

 Moria (disambiguation)
 Nora (disambiguation)
 Nori (disambiguation)